Spilarctia graminivora is a moth in the family Erebidae. It was described by Hiroshi Inoue in 1988. It is found in Japan (the Ryukyu Islands) and Taiwan.

References

Moths described in 1988
graminivora